Ma Janine Hansen (born 5 July 1989), known as Janine Hansen, is a Luxembourger former footballer who played as a forward. She has been a member of the Luxembourg women's national team.

References

1989 births
Living people
Women's association football forwards
Luxembourgian women's footballers
Luxembourg women's international footballers
Luxembourgian people of Filipino descent